The Supreme Court of Ireland is the highest judicial authority in Ireland. The following is a list of current and former judges of the court.

Current members

Former members
  denotes Chief Justices

See also
List of judges of the High Court of Ireland
List of judges of the Court of Appeal of Ireland

References

External links
Courts Service of Ireland
List of former Judges of the Supreme Court since 1924
The Superior Courts of Law: 'Official' Law Reporting in Ireland 1866–2006, Eamonn G Hall, Pages 516–519 

 
Supreme Court
 Supreme Court of Ireland
Ireland